Huey Avenue station is a SEPTA Route 101 trolley stop in Drexel Hill, Pennsylvania. It is officially located near Huey and Edmonds Avenues in Drexel Hill, but in reality is closer to the intersection of Huey Avenue and Mason Avenue.

Trolleys arriving at this station travel between 69th Street Terminal in Upper Darby, Pennsylvania and Orange Street in Media, Pennsylvania. The station has a P&W-era stone shed with a roof where people can go inside when it is raining on the northwest corner of the grade crossing. On the opposite side of this shelter is an ordinary bench. Huey Avenue is the first/last stop along the Route 101 line that doesn't share a right-of-way with the Route 102 line to Sharon Hill, Pennsylvania.

Station layout

External links

 Station from Huey Avenue from Google Maps Street View

SEPTA Media–Sharon Hill Line stations